Vyazovka is a rural locality (a khutor) in Kuybyshevskoye Rural Settlement, Sredneakhtubinsky District, Volgograd Oblast, Russia. The population was 167 as of 2010. There are 6 streets.

Geography 
Vyazovka is located 64 km northeast of Srednyaya Akhtuba (the district's administrative centre) by road. Rakhinka is the nearest rural locality.

References 

Rural localities in Sredneakhtubinsky District